The 2016 Copa Sudamericana final stages were scheduled to be played from 20 September to 7 December 2016. A total of 16 teams competed in the final stages to decide the champions of the 2016 Copa Sudamericana.

Qualified teams

The 15 winners of the second stage (eight from winners of the first stage, four from Brazil, three from Argentina) and the defending champions qualified for the final stages.

Seeding

The qualified teams were seeded in the final stages according to the draw of the tournament, with each team assigned a "seed" 1–16 by draw.

Format

In the final stages, the 16 teams played a single-elimination tournament, with the following rules:
Each tie was played on a home-and-away two-legged basis, with the higher-seeded team hosting the second leg (Regulations Article 3.2).
In the round of 16, quarterfinals, and semifinals, if tied on aggregate, the away goals rule would be used. If still tied, extra time would not be played, and the penalty shoot-out would be used to determine the winner (Regulations Article 5.1).
In the finals, if tied on aggregate, the away goals rule would not be used, and 30 minutes of extra time would be played. If still tied after extra time, the penalty shoot-out would be used to determine the winner (Regulations Article 5.2).

CONMEBOL confirmed that the bracket would remain the same as the draw of the tournament regardless of the nationality of the semifinalists. In previous seasons, if there were two semifinalists from the same association, they had to play each other.

Bracket
The bracket of the final stages was determined by the seeding as follows:
Round of 16:
Match A: Seed 1 vs. Seed 16
Match B: Seed 2 vs. Seed 15
Match C: Seed 3 vs. Seed 14
Match D: Seed 4 vs. Seed 13
Match E: Seed 5 vs. Seed 12
Match F: Seed 6 vs. Seed 11
Match G: Seed 7 vs. Seed 10
Match H: Seed 8 vs. Seed 9
Quarterfinals:
Match S1: Winner A vs. Winner H
Match S2: Winner B vs. Winner G
Match S3: Winner C vs. Winner F
Match S4: Winner D vs. Winner E
Semifinals:
Match F1: Winner S1 vs. Winner S4
Match F2: Winner S2 vs. Winner S3
Finals: Winner F1 vs. Winner F2

Round of 16
The first legs were played on 20–22 September, and the second legs were played on 27–29 September 2016.

Match A

Tied 3–3 on aggregate, Independiente Medellín won on away goals and advanced to the quarterfinals (Match S1).

Match B

San Lorenzo won 4–1 on aggregate and advanced to the quarterfinals (Match S2).

Match C

Tied 0–0 on aggregate, Chapecoense won on penalties and advanced to the quarterfinals (Match S3).

Match D

Atlético Nacional won 3–1 on aggregate and advanced to the quarterfinals (Match S4).

Match E

Tied 3–3 on aggregate, Coritiba won on penalties and advanced to the quarterfinals (Match S4).

Match F

Tied 0–0 on aggregate, Junior won on penalties and advanced to the quarterfinals (Match S3).

Match G

Tied 2–2 on aggregate, Palestino won on away goals and advanced to the quarterfinals (Match S2).

Match H

Cerro Porteño won 4–3 on aggregate and advanced to the quarterfinals (Match S1).

Quarterfinals
The first legs were played on 18–20 October, and the second legs were played on 25–27 October 2016.

Match S1

Cerro Porteño won 2–0 on aggregate and advanced to the semifinals (Match F1).

Match S2

San Lorenzo won 2–1 on aggregate and advanced to the semifinals (Match F2).

Match S3

Chapecoense won 3–1 on aggregate and advanced to the semifinals (Match F2).

Match S4

Atlético Nacional won 4–2 on aggregate and advanced to the semifinals (Match F1).

Semifinals
The first legs were played on 1–2 November, and the second legs were played on 23–24 November 2016.

Match F1

Tied 1–1 on aggregate, Atlético Nacional won on away goals and advanced to the finals.

Match F2

Tied 1–1 on aggregate, Chapecoense won on away goals and advanced to the finals.

Finals

The first leg was scheduled to be played on 30 November, and the second leg was scheduled to be played on 7 December 2016.

The finals were suspended on 29 November following the crash of LaMia Flight 2933. CONMEBOL awarded the title to Chapecoense on 5 December 2016.

References

External links
Copa Sudamericana 2016, CONMEBOL.com 

2